North Sydney may refer to:

North Sydney Council, a local government area in Sydney
North Sydney, New South Wales, a suburb of Sydney, Australia
Division of North Sydney, an electoral division serving the suburb
North Sydney Bears, a professional rugby league football club of North Sydney, NSW
North Sydney Cricket Club
 North Sydney Oval, a multi-use sporting facility in North Sydney, NSW
North Sydney, Nova Scotia, a region of the Cape Breton Regional Municipality in Canada